All Saints' South Elmham is a village and former civil parish in the north of the English county of Suffolk. The parish was combined with St Nicholas South Elmham in 1737 to form the parish of All Saints and St. Nicholas, South Elmham. It is one of the villages that make up the area around Bungay known as The Saints.

The main area of population in the village is clustered around All Saints Common, a large area of common land. All Saints' was recorded as having a population of 192 in 1801 and 232 by the time of the 1851 United Kingdom census. The combined population of the modern parish is around 130.

The parish church of All Saints survives, although it is formally redundant and cared for by the Churches Conservation Trust. It is a Grade I listed building, dates from the 12th-century and is one of around 40 round-tower churches in Suffolk. Other than the parish church, the village has no services.

Notes

References

External links 

Website with photos of All Saints South Elmham, a round-tower church

Villages in Suffolk
Former civil parishes in Suffolk
Waveney District